is a 2018 Japanese film directed by Katsuo Fukuzawa based on the novel by Keigo Higashino.

Plot 
The film centers around the discovery of the body of Michiko Oshitani. Clues, including handwriting at the scene, link her death to the death of the mother of the main character, Kyoichiro Kaga.

Cast 
Hiroshi Abe as Kyoichiro Kaga
Nanako Matsushima as Hiromi Asai 
Junpei Mizobata as Shūhei Matsumiya
Rena Tanaka
Midoriko Kimura
Setsuko Karasuma
Shunpūtei Shōta
Shōzō Uesugi
Kunihiro Suda
Takuma Oto'o
Marie Iitoyo as Hiromi Asai (20 years old)
Hiyori Sakurada as Hiromi Asai (14 years old)
Hiroko Nakajima
Toshiaki Megumi (cameo)
Anne Watanabe (cameo)
Teruyuki Kagawa (cameo)
Mitsuhiro Oikawa
Ran Ito
Fumiyo Kohinata as Tadao Asai
Tsutomu Yamazaki as Takamasa Kaga

Box office 
The film took in USD  $13 million in its Japanese Box Office run. It earned an additional $9,886,245 in China and $197,883 in Hong Kong, bringing its worldwide box office total to $23.2 million.

See also
 Shinzanmono
 The Wings of the Kirin
 Nemuri no Mori

References

External links
 

2018 films
Japanese thriller films
2018 thriller films
Toho films
Films based on works by Keigo Higashino
2010s Japanese films

ja:祈りの幕が下りる時#映画